Ilija Bozoljac and Igor Zelenay were the defending champions but chose not to defend their title.

Mikhail Elgin and Alexander Kudryavtsev won the title after defeating Wesley Koolhof and Matwé Middelkoop 7–6(7–4), 6–3 in the final.

Seeds

Draw

References
 Main Draw

Trofeo Citta di Brescia - Doubles